Helge Nielsen (March 23, 1917 - September 12, 1981) was a Danish canoeist who competed in the 1936 Summer Olympics.

In 1936 he finished 15th and last in the K-1 10000 m event.

References

1917 births
1981 deaths
Danish male canoeists
Canoeists at the 1936 Summer Olympics
Olympic canoeists of Denmark